Prescott Spur is a rock spur running north to south and rising to  between Robson Glacier and Pyne Glacier in the Gonville and Caius Range of Victoria Land. It was named by the Advisory Committee on Antarctic Names in 2007 after BU2 Richard J. Prescott, U.S. Navy (Seabees), who at the time was a member of the construction crew which built the original McMurdo Station, the original Beardmore Refueling Station and the original South Pole Station in the 1955-57 pre-IGY period. He was also a sled dog handler at McMurdo and South Pole Stations.

References

Mountains of Victoria Land